The 2014–15 HockeyAllsvenskan season was the tenth season of the second tier of ice hockey in Sweden under that name. The league featured 14 teams, including Stockholm-based AIK, who were relegated from the SHL following four seasons in the top league.  Also joining HockeyAllsvenskan was HC Vita Hästen, which marked the return of elite-level hockey to Norrköping. A previous Vita Hästen club had played in Sweden's second-tier league until the 1995–96 season, but following that club's bankruptcy in 1996, the new Vita Hästen club rebuilt from the bottom of the league system, culminating in their promotion back to the second tier in the 2014 HockeyAllsvenskan qualifiers.

Sweden's top league, the SHL, expanded from 12 to 14 teams for the 2015–16 season.  This, coupled with changes to the promotion and relegation format, created an "arms race" type of situation, in which teams had a strong incentive to invest heavily to try to secure an SHL spot during this season.

Format
As with previous seasons, the 2014–15 HockeyAllsvenskan season featured a 52-game regular season, with teams facing each other twice at home and twice away; however, significant changes were made to the format for promotion to the SHL. Teams 1 and 2 from HockeyAllsvenskan competed in the HockeyAllsvenskan finals, a best-of-five series in which the winner qualified for play in the 2015–16 SHL season. Meanwhile, teams 3–8 advanced to the playoffs, a single round robin tournament.

The three best teams from the playoff series, along with the loser from the HockeyAllsvenskan finals, and the two teams with the worst records from the 2014–15 SHL season, met in the SHL qualifiers. These six teams were pair off into three best-of-seven series, with the winners of each matchup qualifying to play in the SHL. On 16 February 2015, HockeyAllsvenskan announced that the playoffs was to be sponsored by Swedish firm MECA and have the collective name MECA Hockey Race. This was later rejected by the Swedish Ice Hockey Association, saying they owned the naming rights.

Participating clubs

Regular season

Standings

Post-season

HockeyAllsvenskan finals
VIK Västerås HK and Karlskrona HK, as the first and second place teams from the regular season, advanced to the HockeyAllsvenskan finals, a best-of-five series. Karlskrona HK won the series, and were thus crowned HockeyAllsvenskan champions and qualified for play in the 2015–16 SHL season. VIK Västerås HK meanwhile advanced to the SHL qualifiers.

VIK Västerås HK vs. Karlskrona HK

Playoffs
Teams 3 to 8 played a playoff series, a round robin tournament consisting of five rounds where every team faced each other once. Teams 3–5 had home advantage in three out of five games. Teams were awarded starting points based on their position in the regular season standings: Malmö started with three points, Rögle with two, and BIK Karlskoga with one. The three best teams in the series, Rögle BK, HC Vita Hästen and Malmö Redhawks advanced to the SHL qualifiers.

SHL qualifiers
In the SHL qualifiers, six teams were paired up into three best-of-seven series, where each series winner would qualify for play in the 2015–16 SHL season. Västerås, as winners of the HockeyAllsvenskan finals, were paired with playoff-winners Rögle BK. Modo, who finished 12th in the SHL, were paired with Vita Hästen who finished second in the HockeyAllsvenskan playoffs. Lastly, Leksands IF, who finished 11th in the SHL were paired with Malmö, who finished third in the HockeyAllsvenskan playoffs.

The better-ranked teams Leksand, Modo, and Västerås, had home venue advantage in games 1, 3, 5 and 7. Modo were the first team to win their series, beating Vita Hästen 4–0 on 25 March 2015 and therefore successfully defending their SHL spot. Four days later, on 29 March 2015, Rögle won their series against Västerås 4–1, and were promoted to the SHL. The series between Leksands IF and Malmö Redhawks went to a decisive game seven on 2 April 2015 in which Malmö Redhawks won and therefore also the series with 4–3. Malmö Redhawks were promoted to the SHL while Leksands IF lost their SHL spot.

Leksands IF vs. Malmö Redhawks

Modo Hockey vs. HC Vita Hästen

VIK Västerås HK vs. Rögle BK

2015 HockeyAllsvenskan qualifiers
AIK and Södertälje SK, ranked 13th and 14th after the regular season, were forced to defend their HockeyAllsvenskan spots against four teams from Hockeyettan in the 2015 HockeyAllsvenskan qualifiers. Joining them from Hockeyettan were AllEttan North winners IF Sundsvall, AllEttan South winners IK Pantern, and the two surviving teams from the Hockeyettan playoffs, Västerviks IK and Tingsryds AIF. These six teams played a double round-robin tournament, with the top four teams qualifying for play in HockeyAllsvenskan for the 2015–16 season. AIK defended their spot in the HockeyAllsvenskan while Södertälje SK were relegated to Hockeyettan. Tingsryds AIF, IK Pantern and IF Sundsvall Hockey were promoted to HockeyAllsvenskan.

References

 
2014-15 HockeyAllsvenskan season

2
Swed